Sandhø Heights is a bare rock heights forming the summit area in the central Conrad Mountains, in Queen Maud Land. Discovered and photographed by the German Antarctic Expedition of 1938-39 and mapped by Norway from air photos and surveys by Norwegian Antarctic Expedition, 1956–60, and named Sandhø ("sand heights").

References

Mountains of Queen Maud Land
Princess Astrid Coast